Frontal Group "Ce" was a fighter group of the Polish Air Forces in France, formed in 1940, as part of Groupe de Chasse II/6. The group had 3 pilots, and its leader was lieutenant Arsen Cebrzyński. It was disestablished after the Fall of France in 1940. The group was equipped with Bloch MB.150 fighter aircraft.

Members 
 lieutenant Arsen Cebrzyński (leader)
 corporal Eugeniusz Szaposznikow
 corporal Michał Brzezowski

Citations

Notes

References

Bibliography 
 W. Król, Walczyłem pod niebem Francji, Warsaw, 1984.
 Pilot Wojenny. 4(7)/2000, 07.2000. Warsaw, ECHO.

Fighter aircraft units and formations
Battle of France
Military units and formations established in 1940
Military units and formations disestablished in 1940
Polish Air Force in exile squadrons